Gemmobacter megaterium is a Gram-negative, aerobic and non-motile bacterium from the genus of Gemmobacter which has been isolated from planktonic seaweed from the Zhoushan sea area in China.

References 

Rhodobacteraceae
Bacteria described in 2014